No. 220 Squadron of the Royal Air Force (RAF) was founded in 1918 and disbanded in 1963 after four separate periods of service. The squadron saw service in both the First and Second World Wars, as a maritime patrol unit, and finally as part of Britain's strategic nuclear deterrent.

History

First World War
The squadron predated the foundation of the RAF and was founded as a unit of the Royal Naval Air Service (RNAS) . From 1915, the RNAS formed numbered wings, which controlled their own lettered squadrons. No. 2 Wing RNAS, with its subordinate squadrons, was assigned to the Aegean area.  One of the squadrons was 'C' Squadron, comprising Nos. 475, 476 and 477 Flights. DH.4s were, in time, joined by DH.9s and Sopwith Camels. On the formation of the RAF, on 1 April 1918, the Wing was integrated as No. 62 Wing RAF. The flights kept their numbers, rather than the customary letters, as each Flight operated a different aircraft type and the squadron formed a self-contained bomber, or reconnaissance, force with its own integral fighter cover. No. 475 Flight flew DH.4 day-bombers, No. 476 Flight flew DH.9 day-bombers and the fighter-flight, No. 477 Flight, flew Sopwith Camels. Most of the Wing was based at Mudros, but this squadron was based on the nearby island of Imbros. It was not given the 'number-plate' of No. 220 Sqn., RAF until 14 September 1918. In February 1919 the squadron moved as a cadre to Mudros on the nearby island of Lemnos, where it was disbanded on 21 May 1919.

Second World War

In the buildup to the Second World War, No. 220 Squadron was reformed, as part of the new Coastal Command at RAF Bircham Newton in 1936. It was designated a general reconnaissance (GR) squadron, on maritime patrol duties, flying Ansons. On the outbreak of war it flew patrols from RAF Thornaby, as part of No. 18 Group.

In November 1939, it converted to Hudsons and began a new role, flying strike − or anti-shipping − missions. The squadron became operational in this role, in the North Sea, from May 1940 onwards. In April 1941, still in the anti-shipping role, it moved to RAF Wick to fly strikes against Norwegian coastal traffic.

In February 1942 the squadron began to operate the Fortress, having moved to RAF Nutts Corner that month as part of No. 15 Group.  In June 1942 it moved to RAF Ballykelly and then, in March 1943, to RAF Benbecula in the Outer Hebrides. Detachments also operated from RAF Bircham Newton, RAF St Eval and RAF Detling in 1940, and even from RAF Shallufa in Egypt, from early November 1941.

In October 1943 the squadron transferred to RAF Lagens, in the Azores Islands, as a unit of No. 247 Group. In December 1944, it was re-equipped with Liberators. From 1943 until the end of the war the squadron's role was anti-submarine (A/S) patrols over the southern North Atlantic.

In June 1945, with the end of the war in Europe, the squadron was brought home. It was transferred to Transport Command and Flew trooping flights, bringing men home from India, from October 1945 to April 1946. With this duty done, the squadron was disbanded in May 1946.

Cold War
In September 1951 the squadron was reformed, back as part of Coastal Command and again operating in the maritime reconnaissance (MR) role. It was based at RAF St Mawgan and was equipped with Avro Shackleton aircraft. In 1953, the Squadron aircraft flew in formation in a flypast, on the occasion of the Coronation of Queen Elizabeth II. At the time, the Shackleton 
was fitted with a mid-upper gun-turret, the Bristol turret mounting twin 20 mm Hispano cannon, though this was later removed. No. 220 Squadron was the last RAF operational aircraft so equipped.

In October 1958, the squadron was redesignated as No. 201 Squadron.

The following year, in July 1959, No. 220 (SM) Squadron RAF was reformed. The designation "SM'" stood for Strategic Missile, and the squadron was now equipped with three Thor ballistic missiles, carrying a 1.4 megaton W-49 nuclear warhead, as part of the UK-US strategic deterrent, Project Emily. It was based at RAF North Pickenham in Norfolk until it was disbanded for the last time, along with the other Thor squadrons, in 1963.

See also
 List of Royal Air Force aircraft squadrons
 List of UK Thor missile bases

References

Citations

Bibliography

 Halley, James J. The Squadrons of the Royal Air Force & Commonwealth, 1918 -1988. Tonbridge, Kent, UK: Air Britain (Historians) Ltd., 1988. .
 Jefford, C.G. RAF Squadrons, a Comprehensive Record of the Movement and Equipment of all RAF Squadrons and their Antecedents since 1912. Shrewsbury: Airlife Publishing, 1998 (second edition 2001). .
 Rayner, Ted. Coastal Command Pilot, 1939–1945: Wartime Experiences with 220 & 269 Squadrons. Bognor Regis, West Sussex, UK: Woodfield Publishing Ltd., 1994. .
 Rawlings, John D.R. Coastal, Support and Special Squadrons of the RAF and their Aircraft. London: Jane's Publishing Company Ltd., 1982. .
 Stitt, Robert M. Boeing B-17 Fortress in RAF Coastal Command Service. Sandomierz, Poland: STRATUS sp.j., 2010 (second edition 2019). .

External links

No. 220 Squadron history
No. 220 Squadron movement history

220
Aircraft squadrons of the Royal Air Force in World War II
Maritime patrol aircraft units and formations
Ballistic missile squadrons of the Royal Air Force
Military units and formations disestablished in 1963